George Borba (born on 12 July 1944 in Italy), is a former Israeli international footballer who was part of the squad that competed at the 1968 Summer Olympics and the 1970 FIFA World Cup, Israel's only world cup appearance. His family was Libyan Jew from Tripoli (Libya).

Honours

Club
Hapoel Tel Aviv
AFC champions league (1): 1967
Israeli Premier League (3): 1965–66, 1968–69, 1973–74
Israel Super Cup (1): 1970
Israel State Cup (1): 1972

Maccabi Netanya
Israeli Premier League (1): 1973–74

References

1944 births
Libyan Jews
20th-century Italian Jews
Living people
Israeli footballers
Association football midfielders
Israel international footballers
1968 AFC Asian Cup players
1970 FIFA World Cup players
Hapoel Tel Aviv F.C. players
Hapoel Ramat Gan F.C. players
Maccabi Netanya F.C. players
Footballers at the 1968 Summer Olympics
Olympic footballers of Israel
Italian emigrants to Israel
Libyan emigrants to Israel
Italian people of Libyan-Jewish descent
Italian sportspeople of African descent
Footballers from Tel Aviv
Footballers from Marche